Teignbridge Hundred was the name of one of thirty two ancient administrative units of Devon, England.

The parishes in the hundred were:
Ashburton,
Bickington,
Bovey Tracey,
Hennock,
Highweek,
Ideford,
Ilsington,
Kingsteignton,
Lustleigh,
Manaton,
Moretonhampstead,
North Bovey and
Teigngrace

See also 
 List of hundreds of England and Wales - Devon

References 

Hundreds of Devon